James Hamish Hamilton (15 November 1900 – 24 May 1988) was a half-American half-Scottish rower who competed for Great Britain in the 1928 Summer Olympics. He founded the publishing house Hamish Hamilton Limited.  

Hamilton studied law and language at Gonville and Caius College, Cambridge before attracting attention as an oarsman with Thames Rowing Club. He was a member of the Thames eight which won the Grand Challenge Cup at Henley Royal Regatta in 1927. The Thames eight including Hamilton, won the Grand Challenge Cup again in 1928 and was chosen to represent Great Britain rowing at the 1928 Summer Olympics where they won a silver medal.  He married Jean Forbes-Robertson in 1929, but the marriage ended in 1933.

Hamilton was an employee of the book department at Harrod's before founding his own publishing house Hamish Hamilton in the 1930s. He went on to publish a large number of promising British and American authors, many of whom were personal friends and acquaintances of Jamie Hamilton. Jamie Hamilton sold the firm to the Thomson Organisation in 1965, who resold it to Penguin Books in 1986,

(Hamish comes from the Gaelic form, James the English form – which was also his given name, and Jamie the diminutive form). Jamie Hamilton was often referred to as Hamish Hamilton.

References

Hamish Hamilton Collection held at the University of Bristol Library Special Collections

1900 births
1988 deaths
Alumni of Gonville and Caius College, Cambridge
Rowers at the 1928 Summer Olympics
Olympic rowers of Great Britain
Olympic silver medallists for Great Britain
Olympic medalists in rowing
Scottish male rowers
Medalists at the 1928 Summer Olympics